Rhabdozoum is a genus of bryozoans belonging to the monotypic family Rhabdozoidae.

The species of this genus are found in Australia and New Zealand.

Species 
Rhabdozoum stephensoni 
Rhabdozoum wilsoni

References

Cheilostomatida
Bryozoan genera